is a Japanese mathematician and engineer working in probability theory, applied algebraic geometry and Bayesian statistics. He is currently a professor at Tokyo Institute of Technology in the Department of Computational Intelligence and Systems Science. He is the author of the text, Algebraic Geometry and Statistical Learning Theory, which proposes a generalization of Fisher's regular statistical theory to singular statistical models.

Books
 Mathematical Theory of Bayesian Statistics, CRC Press, 2018, ISBN 9781482238068
 Algebraic Geometry and Statistical Learning Theory, Cambridge University Press, 2009.

References

External links
 Algebraic Geometrical Method in Singular Statistical Estimation. Presentation at Algebraic Statistics Seminar, MSRI, December 17, 2008 (video)

20th-century Japanese mathematicians
21st-century Japanese mathematicians
1959 births
Living people